Mecidiyeköy is a station on the Istanbul Metrobus Bus rapid transit line. It is located on the Istanbul Inner Beltway just west of Mecidiyeköy Square. The station is serviced by five of the seven metrobus routes A connection to the M2 of the Istanbul Metro is available as well as several city bus lines.

The station was opened on 8 September 2008 as part of the ten station eastward expansion of the line.

References

External links
Mecidiyeköy station
Mecidiyeköy in Google Street View

Istanbul Metrobus stations
2008 establishments in Turkey
Şişli